Christopher Davis is an American politician, who is a Republican member of the Connecticut House of Representatives from District 57.

References 

Living people
Republican Party members of the Connecticut House of Representatives
21st-century American politicians
Year of birth missing (living people)